Eulima bifasciata is a species of sea snail, a marine gastropod mollusk in the family Eulimidae. The species is one of a number within the genus Eulima.

Distribution
This species occurs in the following locations:

 Caribbean Sea
 Colombia
 Costa Rica
 Cuba
 Gulf of Mexico
 Lesser Antilles
 Mexico
 Panama
 Puerto Rico
 Venezuela

Description 
The maximum recorded shell length is 10.6 mm.

Habitat 
Minimum recorded depth is 0 m. Maximum recorded depth is 84 m.

This species is known from seamounts and knolls.

References

External links

bifasciata
Gastropods described in 1841